The Ethel Merman Disco Album is a 1979 album by American Broadway performer Ethel Merman. It was released on A&M Records. Over the years, the record became a camp classic, with vinyl copies highly sought out by collectors.

Background
Merman recorded 14 songs for The Ethel Merman Disco Album, although only seven were released on the finished record. Each of the songs was recorded in only one take and arranged vocally the way she always recorded them, with disco instrumentation added later as a backtrack.

In 2002, Fynsworth Alley Records acquired the rights to release the album on CD. The CD release contains one bonus track, a recording of They Say It's Wonderful. There are no plans yet to release the other six tracks.

Reception

In a retrospective review, William Ruhlmann of music database website AllMusic rated The Ethel Merman Disco Album two-and-a-half out of five stars. Ruhlmann noted that "everyone, it seemed, was adding a disco beat and trying to cash in on the current – and temporary – fad" and that Merman "was 20 years past her last big success on the Great White Way and, you'd have thought, ready for retirement." He called the album "pretty much like you'd expect. Arranger Peter Matz creates typical disco arrangements - and Merman sings the way she always does, sounding like she has nothing to do with the background at all." Ruhlmann concluded: "The record is really only good for a laugh, but there's just one joke."

Track listing
"There's No Business Like Show Business" (Berlin) – 5:48
"Everything's Coming Up Roses" (Sondheim, Styne) – 6:30
"I Get a Kick Out of You" (Porter) – 6:09
"Something for the Boys" (Porter) – 5:19
"Some People"  (Sondheim, Styne) – 4:49
"Alexander's Ragtime Band"  (Berlin) – 4:28
"I Got Rhythm"  (Gershwin, Gershwin) – 5:06
"They Say It's Wonderful" (Berlin) (bonus track on CD reissue)

Personnel
 Ethel Merman - vocals
 Chuck Berghofer, Greg Lee - bass
 Dennis Budimir, Mitch Holder, Michael Anthony - guitars
 John Berkman, Peter Matz - keyboards
 Steve Schaeffer - drums
 Paulinho da Costa, Garyno - percussion
 Ernie Watts, Bud Shank - saxophone solos
 Bobby Borelli, Jon Joyce, George Ferren, Steve Smith, Manny Slali, Jon Randazzo - background vocals
 Stephanie Spruill, Marilyn Jackson - background vocal directors

See also
List of songs considered the worst
Golden Throats
Disco Demolition Night

References

External links
Official YouTube playlist

1979 albums
Ethel Merman albums
Disco albums by American artists
A&M Records albums
Albums recorded at A&M Studios
Albums arranged by Peter Matz